Alan Whittle (born ) is a former professional rugby league footballer who played in the 1960s and 1970s.

Playing career

Challenge Cup Final appearances
Alan Whittle was a unused interchange/substitute in St. Helens' 16-13 victory over Leeds in the 1972 Challenge Cup Final during the 1971–72 season at Wembley Stadium, London on Saturday 13 May 1972, played left-, i.e. number 4, in Warrington's 24-9 victory over Featherstone Rovers in the 1974 Challenge Cup Final during the 1973–74 season at Wembley Stadium, London on Saturday 11 May 1974, in front of a crowd of 77,400 and played  in the 7-14 defeat by Widnes in the 1975 Challenge Cup Final during the 1974–75 season at Wembley Stadium, London on Saturday 10 May 1975, in front of a crowd of 85,998.

County Cup Final appearances
Alan Whittle played left-, i.e. number 4, in St. Helens' 2-2 draw with Warrington in the 1967 Lancashire County Cup Final during the 1967–68 season at Station Road, Swinton on Saturday 7 October 1967 (he was replaced by Billy Benyon in the replay), played  in the 30-2 victory over Oldham in the 1968 Lancashire County Cup Final during the 1968–69 season at Central Park, Wigan on Friday 25 October 1968, and played  in the 4-7 defeat by Leigh in the 1970 Lancashire County Cup Final during the 1970–71 season at Station Road, Swinton on Saturday 28 November 1970.

BBC2 Floodlit Trophy Final appearances
Alan Whittle played  in St. Helens' 4-7 defeat by Wigan in the 1968 BBC2 Floodlit Trophy Final during the 1968-69 season at Central Park, Wigan on Tuesday 17 December 1968. played  in the 5-9 defeat by Leeds in the 1970 BBC2 Floodlit Trophy Final during the 1970–71 season at Headingley Rugby Stadium, Leeds on Tuesday 15 December 1970, played left-, i.e. number 4, in Warrington's 0-0 draw with Salford in the 1974 BBC2 Floodlit Trophy Final during the 1974–75 season at The Willows, Salford on Tuesday 17 December 1974, and played  in the 5-10 defeat by Salford in the 1974 BBC2 Floodlit Trophy Final replay during the 1974–75 season at Wilderspool Stadium, Warrington on Tuesday 28 January 1975.

Player's No.6 Trophy Final appearances
Alan Whittle played  in Warrington's 27-16 victory over Rochdale Hornets in the 1973–74 Player's No.6 Trophy Final during the 1973–74 season at Central Park, Wigan on Saturday 9 February 1974.

Captain Morgan Trophy Final appearances
Alan Whittle played  in Warrington's 4-0 victory over Featherstone Rovers in the 1973–74 Captain Morgan Trophy Final during the 1973–74 season at The Willows, Salford on Saturday 26 January 1974, in front of a crowd of 5,259.

References

External links
Search for "Whittle" at rugbyleagueproject.org
Statistics at wolvesplayers.thisiswarrington.co.uk
Profile at saints.org.uk
Statistics at wigan.rlfans.com

1947 births
Living people
Barrow Raiders players
Lancashire rugby league team players
Place of birth missing (living people)
Rugby league five-eighths
St Helens R.F.C. players
Warrington Wolves players
Wigan Warriors players